The Little Lake George Wilderness is part of Ocala National Forest. The  refuge was established on September 28, 1984. The Wilderness is at the confluence of the St. Johns and Oklawaha Rivers.

Flora
Plants in the area include red maple, ash, cypress, cabbage palm, loblolly, slash and pond pine.

Fauna
Sunfish, bass and crappie can be found in the waters here.

External links
 Little Lake George Wilderness at Wildernet
 Little Lake George Wilderness - official site at Ocala National Forest

IUCN Category Ib
Protected areas of Putnam County, Florida
Wilderness areas of Florida
Ocala National Forest
Protected areas established in 1984
1984 establishments in Florida